Tahquitz (sometimes ) is a spirit found in the legends of the Cahuilla, Kumeyaay and Luiseño Native American people of Southern California. Accounts of the legend vary significantly, but most agree that Tahquitz represents evil or death, and his spirit makes its home on Mount San Jacinto. Some accounts report that he steals people and/or their souls and devours them on the mountain. Tahquitz manifests himself in the form of fireballs, lighting, meteors and thunderous sounds on the mountain and in the canyons.

Agua Caliente Legend
Some accounts of the legend state that Tahquitz Canyon played a key role in the story. The canyon is located on the Agua Caliente reservation lands, and is an important cultural site. The tribal group's web page dedicated to the canyon describes The Legend of Taquitz as follows:

Mukat's People
Author Lowell John Bean, in his book Mukat's People; The Cauilla Indians of Southern California, applies a different orthography, rendering the name as Taqwuš instead of Tahquitz. He describes Taqwuš as one of the nakutem, those who were created in the beginning by Mukat and Temayawt. Specifically, Taqwuš is the first Puul, or Shaman, and he manifests himself as a meteor or a human-like form that emits blue sparks. Taqwuš lived on San Jacinto Peak and was the cause of misfortune. He was most active at night and would travel about stealing souls.

Origin and application of the name
In the Luiseño language the word Tahquitz derives from the word Takwish, meaning "electric fireball" or "meteor". However, it is thought that the Luiseño adopted the story from the Cahuilla. The spelling of the word Tahquitz varied, until it was standardized by the 1897–1898 U.S. Geological Survey of the San Jacinto quadrangle. Alternate spellings include:

Several peaks on Mount San Jacinto have been named for Tahquitz:
Tahquitz Peak, an  secondary peak on Mount San Jacinto
Tahquitz Rock, an  large granite outcropping, also called "Lily rock"
Red Tahquitz, an  peak that has a reddish hue

Additional features on Mount San Jacinto include:
Tahquitz Meadow or Valley at the  elevation
Tahquitz Falls, within the canyon at the  level

Beyond the mountain, the name Tahquitz has been applied to:
Tahquitz Canyon Way, a main thoroughfare in Palm Springs that leads to the Palm Springs International Airport
Tahquitz mousetail, the common name for Ivesia callida, a member of the rose family
Tahquitz OG, a strain of cannabis
Tahquitz High School in Hemet, California

Cultural references
The Tribe of Tahquitz is an Honor Boy Scout organization of the Long Beach Area Council 
Camp Tahquitz is a Long Beach Area Council camp in Angelus Oaks, California
Tahquitz is a supporting character in the Louis L'Amour novel, The Lonesome Gods (1983), that is mistaken for a demigod of Native American legend and lives in the mountains alone near Agua Caliente. The story features the mountain as well as the Mojave and Colorado Deserts of California as the setting of the story. 
Tahquitz Exchange is a novel by Bernnie Reese (1993). DeChamp Co. pp. 225. 
Tahquitz is a major recurring support character in the second novel Idyllwild of The Sheriff Wyler Scott Series a novel by "Mark Paul" Sebar which takes place in the modern Colorado Desert and High San Jacinto Mountains. pp. 233

See also

Cahuilla traditional narratives
Cahuilla mythology
Luiseño traditional narratives
Kumeyaay traditional narratives
List of Riverside County, California, placename etymologies
Tahquitz (disambiguation)

References

Bibliography

Citations

External links
Tahquitz Canyon home page.

Cahuilla
Agua Caliente Band of Cahuilla Indians
Luiseño
Kumeyaay
Gods of the indigenous peoples of North America
Death gods
Death in Riverside County, California
History of Riverside County, California
Native Americans in Riverside County, California
Religion in Riverside County, California